Intersectin-1 is a protein that, in humans, is encoded by the ITSN1 gene.

Function 

The protein encoded by this gene is a cytoplasmic membrane-associated protein that indirectly coordinates endocytic membrane traffic with the actin assembly machinery. In addition, the encoded protein may regulate the formation of clathrin-coated vesicles and could be involved in synaptic vesicle recycling. This protein has been shown to interact with dynamin, CDC42, SNAP23, SNAP25, SPIN90, EPS15, EPN1, EPN2, and STN2. Multiple transcript variants encoding different isoforms have been found for this gene, but the full-length nature of only two of them have been characterized so far.

Interactions 

ITSN1 has been shown to interact with:

 CDC42,
 SCAMP1 
 SNAP-25,  and
 SOS1.

References

Further reading 

 
 
 
 
 
 
 
 
 
 
 
 
 
 
 
 

EH-domain-containing proteins